Steven King is a political commentator and public relations consultant and the former chief political advisor to Nobel laureate David Trimble.

Early life and education
King graduated with a First Class degree in Political Science from Oxford University, subsequently completing a Master of Social Science in Humanities degree at the University of Ulster and a Doctor of Philosophy degree from The Queen's University of Belfast (his PhD thesis focused on Irish constitutional republicanism/Charles Haughey).

Ulster Unionist advisor
King served as political advisor to Nobel Peace Laureate and First Minister of Northern Ireland David Trimble for six years (1998–2004). He was the Ulster Unionist party negotiator on equality, human rights and cultural issues in the multi-party talks leading to the Good Friday Agreement. At Stormont, he was responsible for political communication strategies, party management issues and drafting position papers. He was also Lord Trimble’s main speechwriter.

Public relations
In 1996, King began writing a weekly column for the Belfast Telegraph, before transferring to the Irish Examiner in 2005. He left formal politics in 2005 to work in public relations, initially assuming responsibility for dealing with the reputational issues arising from the Office of Fair Trading inquiry into alleged fee-fixing for the Independent Schools Council, before becoming External Relations Director for Policy Exchange (2006–2008), a centre-right think-tank, then, latterly, as a director of APCO Worldwide (2008–2012), the global public affairs and communications firm

Personal life
King's marriage, in 2005, to Jean-Claude Madrange was publicly denounced by the DUP politician Ian Paisley Jr.

In August 2010, an inquest at St Pancras Court in London found that King's partner, Jean-Claude Madrange, had taken his own life on 8 May. St Pancras Court was told that Mr Madrange was struggling with bipolar disorder and had tried to commit suicide by taking an overdose one month earlier. An obituary published in The Times read: "Jean-Claude (suddenly) RIP Baba. "Oh, how great is love! And how little am I!" Steven King, 55 Dean St, W1." (The quotation is taken from Khalil Gibran's poem 'A Lover's Call XXVII'.)

In June 2012, the BBC reported that King was critically ill in a hospital in Delhi, India. Six weeks later, the BBC reported that King remained critically ill in intensive care in Delhi. King was transferred to the UK where he spent nearly 18 months in critical care.  He is now recovering in rehabilitation.

References

Living people
Year of birth missing (living people)